Omowale Akintunde is an African-American author, film director and academic with an interest in the areas of education, race, and diversity. He was the Chair of the Department of Black Studies at the University of Nebraska at Omaha from 2008 to 2011 and sits on the editorial board of the Journal of the National Association for Multicultural Education.  In 2010, Akintunde received an Emmy Award for the feature-length documentary film An Inaugural Ride to Freedom which he directed. Akintunde also wrote and directed the film Wigger (2010) which follows the life of an "impoverished white teen with a neo-Nazi father and a black best friend," who adopts African-American life and culture. The film originated from a 30-minute version which was Akintunde's thesis film at the New York Film Academy in 2007, and was re-shot in Omaha, Nebraska in 2009. The full-length feature film premiered in April 2010.

Early life
Omowale Akintunde was born December 20, 1956 (née Darrell Vincent Lewis) to Sir Alfred Lewis, a postal worker, and Annie Lewis (née Woods), a homemaker. Akintunde graduated from Williamson High School in Mobile, Alabama in 1974. He was awarded a scholarship to Alabama State University where he majored in music education and was a member of the famed Marching Hornets band. There he also became a member of the Gamma Beta chapter of Phi Beta Sigma fraternity.

Upon graduation from Alabama State University in 1979, magna cum laude, Akintunde taught elementary school in New Orleans, Louisiana  He then served from 1981-84 in the United States Army. His last duty station was at Fort Meade, Maryland. After military service, Akintunde was hired as a high school music teacher at Anacostia Senior High School in Washington D.C.  There his ensemble received distinction by being highlighted in a feature story in the Washington Post and recorded a record album under his direction.  Akintunde also taught at Forestville High School in Forestville, Maryland.

In 1992, Akintunde received a scholarship to study for a master's degree also at Alabama State University. Upon receiving the Master of Music Education degree one year later, he was awarded a Gus T. Ridgel fellowship to pursue his doctoral studies at the University of Missouri-Columbia. His doctoral thesis was titled The Effects of "Using Rap Music as a Pedagogical Device in the instruction of Musical Form with Urban African-American Middle School Students". It was at Mizzou that Akintunde was inspired by African-American scholar Sunidata Chajua to change his name from Darrell Vincent Lewis to Omowale Achebe Akintunde. He ultimately received the Anderson Award for Outstanding Teaching and the top graduate student award.

Early career
Upon graduation from Mizzou with a Ph.D. in Curriculum and Instruction summa cum laude in 1996, Dr. Akintunde accepted his first professorial appointment at the University of Wyoming as an assistant professor in the College of Education. There he also served as chair of the African-American Studies Department. In 2003, Dr. Akintunde became a professor at the University of Southern Indiana where he achieved tenure.

Film career
In 2007, Akintunde was accepted to the New York Film Academy at Universal Studios in Los Angeles, California and left to study there on a sabbatical. While studying there, Akintunde met Meshach Taylor, an Emmy-award-winning actor and star of the television series Designing Women. Taylor became a mentor and close friend of Akintunde and would play a major role in catapulting his presence in the film world. Taylor agreed to star in Akintunde's thesis film, Wigger, a role he would reprise in the feature film version. Upon graduation from the New York Film Academy, Akintunde accepted a position as chair of the Department of Black Studies at the University of Nebraska, Omaha. In 2008, Akintunde produced and directed his first feature film, "An Inaugural Ride to Freedom". The film was based on the ruminations and experiences of a group of professors, students, and community persons who embarked on a bus ride to the inauguration of America's first Black president. The film was released in 2000 and received the Emmy Award for Best Documentary-Cultural.

Wigger was released in 2010, with film critic Leo Biga writing in a review that "Wigger joins Omaha's A Time for Burning in becoming two of the most important films on race." A premiere screening was also orchestrated in Los Angeles by another Akintunde mentor, Bill Duke. In 2013, Akintunde produced and directed a second road film commemorating the second inauguration of Barack Obama and his original film was re-broadcast on PBS in honor of the event.

In 2018, Akintunde retired from the University of Nebraska and became a full-time diversity consultant and filmmaker. His most recent projects are a fictional memoir Waiting for the Sissy Killer (Trafford Publications) and a sitcom pilot, It Takes a Village, starring veteran actor Ernest Harden, Jr. Akintunde co-stars in the pilot which he also wrote, produced, and directed.

Bibliography
Multiculturalism and the Teacher Education Experience: Essays on Race, Class, and Culture (2007) iUniverse 
The Adventures of Darrell and the Invincible Man (2008) Trafford Publishing

Filmography
Holy Smoke (2007) – Writer/Director
Hollywood and Vying (2007) – Writer/Director
Black and Blue (2007) – Writer/Director
Switch Swap (2007) – Writer/Director
Communion (2007) – Writer/Director
Wigger, a Short Film (2008) – Writer/Director
Mama 'n' Em (2008) – Director
An Inaugural Ride to Freedom (2009) – Producer/Director
Wigger (2010) – Writer/Director
An Inaugural Ride to Freedom: The Journey Continues (2013) – Director/Producer
It Takes A Village (2019) – Writer/Producer/Director

References

External links
Official website

Living people
African-American film directors
African-American screenwriters
Emmy Award winners
Writers from Mobile, Alabama
New York Film Academy alumni
American people of Nigerian descent
American people of Yoruba descent
African-American academics
Yoruba academics
Yoruba filmmakers
Screenwriters from Alabama
Film directors from Alabama
Year of birth missing (living people)
21st-century African-American people